Since May 2019, the KwaZulu-Natal Legislature, official legislature of the KwaZulu-Natal province of South Africa, has consisted of 80 members from 8 different political parties, elected on 8 May 2019 in the 2019 South African general election. The ruling African National Congress (ANC) retained its majority in the legislature by earning a total of 44 seats, a loss of eight seats from the previous legislature. 

The Inkatha Freedom Party (IFP) (13 seats) regained the title of official opposition, after losing it to the Democratic Alliance (DA) in the 2014 general election. The DA now holds 11 seats, one more than it held in the previous legislative session, and is the third largest party. The Economic Freedom Fighters (EFF) occupy 8 seats, a gain of six from the previous election. Four political parties, including the National Freedom Party (NFP), Minority Front (MF), African Transformation Movement (ATM) and African Christian Democratic Party (ACDP), each hold one seat.

Members of the Provincial Legislature (MPLs) are elected through a system of party-list proportional representation with closed lists. This means that each voter casts a vote for one political party, and seats in the legislature are assigned to the parties in proportion to the number of votes they received. The seats are then filled by members by lists acceded by the parties before the election.

Members of the 6th Provincial Legislature took office on 22 May 2019. During the first sitting, Ntobeko Boyce was elected as the new Speaker with Mluleki Ndobe as the new Deputy Speaker, while Sihle Zikalala was elected Premier. They are all members of the ANC. Velenkosini Hlabisa of the IFP assumed the role of Leader of the Opposition.

Composition
This is a graphical comparison of party strengths as they are in the 6th KwaZulu-Natal Legislature.

Note this is not the official seating plan of the KwaZulu-Natal Legislature.

|-style="background:#e9e9e9;"
!colspan="2" style="text-align:left"| Party !! style="text-align:center"| Seats 
|-
|  || 44
|-
|  || 13 
|-
|  || 11 
|-
|  || 8
|-
|  || 1
|-
|  || 1 
|-
|  || 1 
|-
|  || 1 
|-
|colspan="2" style="text-align:left"| Total || style="text-align:right"| 80
|}

Members
This table depicts the list of members of the 6th KwaZulu-Natal Legislature, as elected in the election of 8 May 2019 and sworn in on 22 May 2019 and taking into account changes in membership since the election. It consists of the members' names, parliamentary group and position.

There was high turnover in the ANC caucus. Early in the legislative term in 2019, three MPLs – Mxolisi Kaunda, Mthandeni Dlungwana, and Weziwe Thusi – resigned from the legislature; they were replaced by the next three ANC members on the party list: Nozipho Mavuso, Themba Mtshali, and Lusiwe Ngubane. In 2020, Ricardo Mthembu and Mluleki Ndobe died and were replaced by Zandile Gumede and Hlobisile Dlamini respectively. In early 2021, Bridget Ntshangase and Bheki Ntuli died; they were replaced by Mpumelelo Zulu and Phumlile Zulu in late February. Finally, Ravi Pillay resigned in August 2022 and was replaced by Ntuthuko Mahlaba later the same month. 

On the opposition benches, former members include Christopher Pappas (resigned in 2021), Mbali Ntuli (resigned in 2022), Zwakele Mncwango (resigned in 2022), and Rishigen Viranna (resigned in 2022).

References

External links
Members – KZN Legislature

Legislature